"Shock!" (stylized as "SHOCK!") is the eleventh major single by Japanese idol pop group Cute. It was released on January 6, 2010, in both normal and limited editions, the limited edition containing a DVD with a version of the "Shock!" PV on it and coming with a different cover. The first press of each edition also contained a card with a serial number on it, used in an event draw to promote the single's release. This was the first single to be released after Erika Umeda's graduation, which also makes it the first single not to feature her. Airi Suzuki is "centred" in this single, taking on the main vocals. The single peaked at #1 on the Oricon daily charts, and #5 on the weekly charts. The single also reached #13 on the monthly chart for January, with a reported total of 23,389 copies sold.

Track listings

CD single

Single V

Event V

Personnel
Track 1
Yuusuke Itagaki (programming)
Chino (chorus)
Track 2
Yasuo Asai (guitar, programming)
Airi Suzuki (chorus)

Charts

References

External links 
 Review: SHOCK! / C-ute - Hotexpress
 Profile on the Hello! Project official website
 Shock! at the Up-Front Works discography

2010 songs
2010 singles
Japanese-language songs
Cute (Japanese idol group) songs
Songs written by Tsunku
Song recordings produced by Tsunku
Zetima Records singles